Basilea is the Italian and Romansh name for Basel, a city in Switzerland.

Basilea may also refer to:

 Basilea (bacterium), a genus of bacteria
 Basilea (queen), first queen of the legendary Kingdom of Atlantis in Ancient Greek folk tradition
 2033 Basilea, a main-belt asteroid
 Basilea Pharmaceutica, a Switzerland-based biopharmaceutical company
 Basilea Amoa-Tetteh (born 1984), Ghanaian footballer
 Basilea Schlink (1904–2001), German religious leader

See also
 Basella, a genus of plants
 Basilia (disambiguation)